The following are lists of highest-grossing Greek films screened at cinemas in Greece and globally. The commercial course of Greek cinema has changed over time. The more successful periods are the period of 1950s and 1960s, often called the golden age of Greek cinema, and the recent 2000s.

Highest-grossing Greek films

Highest-grossing Greek films by year

Greek films with biggest number of admissions
The following table lists known estimated box office ticket sales for various high-grossing Greek films screened at cinemas in Greece.

Greek films with biggest number of admissions by year

See also
Cinema of Greece

References

Greece
Lists of Greek films
Greek film-related lists